New Zealand competed at the 1968 Summer Paralympics in Tel Aviv, Israel.  It was the nation's first delegation to the Paralympics.  The team finished eighteenth in the medal table and won a total of 4 medals; 1 gold, 2 silver and 1 bronze.

Medalists

See also 
 New Zealand at the 1968 Summer Olympics

References

Nations at the 1968 Summer Paralympics
1968
Paralympics